Jean Pascal vs. Bernard Hopkins, billed as Dynasty, was a light heavyweight championship fight for the WBC, IBO, and The Ring light heavyweight titles. The bout was held on December 18, 2010, at Colisée Pepsi, Quebec City, Quebec, Canada and was televised on Showtime.

The fight
The fight started at a good pace, with both fighters getting combinations and landing good shots. Hopkins was knocked down in the 1st round, and again in the 3rd.  He complained that it was a blow to the back of the head that caused him to go down in the final seconds of the 1st, but the Montreal ref, Michael Griffin, scored it a knockdown. The knockdown was clearer in the 3rd, when Pascal tagged B-Hop with a left. Hopkins dropped to the canvas and got up with no problem. Pascal began to wear down and Hopkins picked up the pace, knowing he was down on the scorecards. The Canadian boxer was the younger and quicker but was not able to do much and was not that active.  He was hit repeatedly in the final six rounds.
Hopkins launched a desperate flurry in the final round but failed to put Pascal down. "The 12th round was vicious," Hopkins said. "He looked to be tired from the sixth round. He was gasping. He held every time I got close. And I just kept coming forward throwing punches. He was holding on for dear life."

There was some early debate over whether the Canadian and Belgian judges' cards had been altered, but that notion was discarded by both camps. Hopkins reluctantly accepted a draw on Pascal's turf, even if he felt he won—and insists he would if they fought again. Hopkins said he wants a rematch, but not in Canada.

"Look at my record -- anyone I fought twice I destroyed," he said.

Undercard

Televised
Welterweight bout:  Paul Malignaggi vs.  Michael Lozada
Malignaggi defeats Lozada via TKO at 2:33 of round 6.
Middleweight bout:  Peter Quillin vs.  Martin Desjardins
Quillin defeats Desjardins via KO at 2:53 of round 1.
Super Middleweight bout:  Daniel Jacobs vs.  Jesse Orta
Jacobs defeats Orta via TKO at round 5.

Preliminary card
Welterweight bout:  Kevin Bizier vs.  Ronnie Warrior Jr
Bizier defeats Warrior via RTD at 3:00 of round 3.
Lightweight bout:  Pier-Olivier Côté vs.  Cesar Soriano
Cote defeats Soriano via TKO at 0:30 of round 1.
Heavyweight bout:  Tyson Fury vs.  Zack Page
Fury defeats Page via unanimous decision.
Heavyweight bout:  Eric Martel Bahoeli vs.  Ruben Rivera
Bahoeli defeats Rivera via unanimous decision.
Light Middleweight bout:  Mikael Zewski vs.  Leonardo Rojas
Zewski defeats Rojas via TKO at 2:59 of round 2.

References

Boxing matches
Boxing matches involving Tyson Fury
Boxing matches involving Bernard Hopkins
2010 in boxing
Boxing in Canada
Sport in Quebec City
2010 in Canadian sports
Golden Boy Promotions
December 2010 sports events in Canada